General Post is a 1920 British silent drama film directed by Thomas Bentley and starring Douglas Munro, Lilian Braithwaite and Joyce Dearsley. It was based on the play General Post by J. E. Harold Terry in which Lillian Braithwaite had appeared when it premiered at the Haymarket Theatre in March 1917.

Plot
During the First World War a small-town tailor rises to become a General.

Cast
 Douglas Munro...Albert Smith 
 Lilian Braithwaite...Lady Broughton 
 Joyce Dearsley...Betty Broughton 
 Robert Henderson Bland...Edward Smith 
 Dawson Millward...Denys Broughton 
 Colstan Mansell...Alec Broughton 
 Teddy Arundell...Jobson 
 Sara de Groot...Miss Prendergast 
 Adelaide Grace...Lady Wareing 
 Thomas Canning...Lord Wareing 
 Irene Drew...Mary Wareing

References

External links
 
 General Post at BFI Player, British Film Institute

1921 films
British drama films
1920s English-language films
British films based on plays
Films directed by Thomas Bentley
Ideal Film Company films
British black-and-white films
British silent feature films
1920s British films
Silent drama films